Laptev may refer to:

Laptev Sea, one of the seas in the Arctic Ocean
Laptev Strait, strait in Russian Far East

People with the surname
Ari Laptev (born 1950), Ukrainian mathematician
Dmitry Laptev (1701–1771), Russian explorer
Khariton Laptev (1700–1763), Russian explorer
Vladimir Laptev (politician) (born 1945), Russian politician
Yury Laptev (born 1960), Russian opera singer, opera director, theatre lecturer, and presidential adviser
Yuri Grigorievich Laptev (1903–1984), Russian and Soviet writer, journalist and actor